Donald Kenneth Andrew MacKenzie  (30 November 1916 – 12 June 1940, Edinburgh) was a Scotland international rugby union player.

Rugby Union career

Amateur career

His home club was Edinburgh Wanderers.

Provincial career

He was capped for Edinburgh District.

International career

He played for  twice at number eight in the 1939 Home Nations Championship.

Death

He was the first Scottish rugby internationalist to be killed in World War II. He died in June 1940 when his Spitfire crashed near Edinburgh during a training flight.

See also
 List of Scottish rugby union players killed in World War II

References

Sources

 Bath, Richard (ed.) The Scotland Rugby Miscellany (Vision Sports Publishing Ltd, 2007 )

1916 births
1940 deaths
Scottish rugby union players
Scotland international rugby union players
Royal Air Force personnel killed in World War II
Edinburgh Wanderers RFC players
Edinburgh District (rugby union) players
Military personnel from Edinburgh
Royal Air Force officers
Rugby union players from Edinburgh
Rugby union number eights